= Hands-On Data Visualization =

2021 textbook by Jack Dougherty and Ilya Ilyankou

Hands-On Data Visualization: Interactive Storytelling from Spreadsheets to Code
- Front cover of the first edition, 2021
- Authors: Jack Dougherty and Ilya Ilyankou
- Original title: Hands-On Data Visualization: Interactive Storytelling from Spreadsheets to Code
- Language: English
- Publisher: O’Reilly Media
- Publication date: 2021
- Publication place: USA

Hands-On Data Visualization: Interactive Storytelling from Spreadsheets to Code is a book on data visualization and digital storytelling by Jack Dougherty and Ilya Ilyankou. It was first published in 2021 by O’Reilly Media. Hands-On Data Visualization has been included in the syllabuses of various higher education courses in data visualization, including at Carnegie Mellon University, San Jose State University and Arizona State University.

== Overview ==
Hands-On Data Visualization details design methods for interactive charts and customized maps, starting with drag-and-drop tools including Google Sheets, Datawrapper, and Tableau Public. It progresses to detail methods for editing source code templates built with Chart.js, Highcharts, and Leaflet on GitHub.

== Translations ==
Hands-On Data Visualization has been translated into Traditional Chinese and Korean.
